The EN 1090 standards are European standards that regulate the fabrication and assembly of steel and aluminium structures and are recognized by the Construction Products Regulation.

EN 1090 comprises three parts:

 EN 1090-1: Requirements for conformity assessment for structural components (CE-Marking)
 EN 1090-2: Technical requirements for the execution of steel structures
 EN 1090-3: Technical requirements for the execution of aluminium structures

EN 1090 replaced the nationally applicable regulations, e.g. in Germany DIN 18800-7 and DIN V 4113-3.

References 

Execution class in EN 1090 certification.

External links 

 List of Harmonized Standards

01090
Structural engineering standards
Structural steel